Perry Downtown Historic District is a national historic district located at Perry in Wyoming County, New York. The district encompasses 41 contributing buildings in the village of Perry.  They are a variety of commercial, institutional, and governmental buildings with most built between 1850 and 1918. Most of the commercial buildings are two-stories and constructed of brick. They include the Town Hall (1909), Masonic Temple (1914), Bussey Block (1898), Bailey-Roche Block (c. 1836), A. Cole and Wygant Building (1867), Garrison Building (1901), Rufus Smith Block (1856), Howell Building (1895), Traver Place Apartments (1924), and the Wise Building (1903).

It was listed on the National Register of Historic Places in 2012.

Gallery

References

Historic districts on the National Register of Historic Places in New York (state)
Historic districts in Wyoming County, New York
National Register of Historic Places in Wyoming County, New York